Pachybrachis cephalicus is a species of case-bearing leaf beetle in the family Chrysomelidae. It is found in North America.

References

cephalicus